Juliana Jendo (born November 30, 1951 in Tel Tamer, Syria, Syriac: ܓܘܠܝܢܐ ܓܢܕܐ) is an Assyrian singer and actress who, unlike many other Assyrian Neo-Aramaic-speaking artists, has occasionally recorded songs in Turoyo, Chaldean Neo-Aramaic and as well as in Arabic. She has mostly recorded folk dance music.

Biography
Born on November 30, 1962  in Tel Tamer, Syria, she studied French literature at a university there. In 1980, she and her family immigrated to the United States. She currently resides in Chicago, Illinois. Furthermore, she is on honorary chairwoman of the organization Nasraya Ad Dema that she founded.

Discography
 1987 – Mardita
 1988 – Khater Aynatoukh
 1990 – Love & Dance
 1993 – Wardeh Deesheh
 1994 – The Flowers Of Assyria
 1994 – Qadari (Arabic)
 1995 – Athro Halyo (Turoyo)
 1998 – Ashek D'Mathwathan
 2003 – Mellatti
 2008 – Elemo Halyo (turoyo)
 2008 – Tel Kepeh (Arabic, Turoyo)
 2010 – Golden Tunes
 2015 – Talibootha

Filmography
 1988 – Semeleh (Silent short film)
 1991 – Wardeh Deesheh (Crushed Flowers) (Lead role: Nineveh and Nina)
 1994 – The Flowers of Assyria (8 Video clips)
 2005 – The Cost of Happiness (Supporting role: Yimma "Mother")

References

External links
 Qeenatha music profile
lastfm music profile

Living people
Assyrian musicians
American people of Assyrian descent
Syriac-language singers
Syrian emigrants to the United States
People from Detroit
Singers from Detroit
1962 births
Arabic-language singers